Sir Thomas Mansell, 1st Baronet (1556 – 20 December 1631) was a Welsh politician who sat in the House of Commons  at various times between 1597 and 1614.

Mansell was the eldest son of Sir Edward Mansall of Margam. Mansell was knighted in 1581. Then in 1593 Mansell was High Sheriff of Glamorgan.  In 1597, he was elected Member of Parliament for Glamorgan. He was appointed one of council of the Marches on 7 July 1602 and was  High Sheriff of Glamorgan again in 1603.

In 1605 Mansell was re-elected MP for Glamorgan and sat until 1611. He was created  a baronet on 22 May 1611.  He was re-elected MP for Glamorgan in 1614 for the Addled Parliament. 
 
Mansell died at the age of 75 and was buried at Margam. 

Mansell married firstly Mary daughter of Lewis Lord Mordaunt. His second marriage was to Jane Fuller, widow successively of John Bussey of Hainor Lincolnshire and John Fuller, and daughter of Thomas Pole or Powell of Bishops Hall.

References

1556 births
1631 deaths
People from Neath Port Talbot
Members of the Parliament of England (pre-1707) for constituencies in Wales
English MPs 1597–1598
English MPs 1604–1611
English MPs 1614
Baronets in the Baronetage of England
High Sheriffs of Glamorgan